The 1947–48 Norwegian 1. Divisjon season was the ninth season of ice hockey in Norway. Eight teams participated in the league, and Sportsklubben Strong won the championship.

Regular season

External links 
 Norwegian Ice Hockey Federation

Nor
GET-ligaen seasons
1947–48 in Norwegian ice hockey